Hazzaa Ahmed Al-Ghamdi (born 11 January 2001), is a Saudi Arabian professional footballer who plays as a midfielder for Saudi Professional League side Al-Wehda.

Career
Al-Ghamdi started his career at the youth team of (manchester united) and represented the club at every level.

Career statistics

Club

Notes

References

External links
 

2001 births
Living people
Saudi Arabian footballers
Saudi Arabia youth international footballers
Association football midfielders
Al-Wehda Club (Mecca) players
Saudi Professional League players
Saudi First Division League players